Norman Deane may refer to:

 Norman Deane, pseudonym of John Creasey (1908–1973), English crime and science fiction writer
 Norman Deane (cricketer) (1875–1950), Australian cricketer